The Mad Marriage is a lost 1925 silent film drama directed by Frank P. Donovan. It starred Rosemary Davies, a sister of Marion Davies in her only film. The low-budget B-movie silent film boasted some well-known film names of the period.

Cast
Rosemary Davies - Alice Darvil
Harrison Ford - Walter Butler
Maurice Costello - 
Richard Carle - 
Paul Panzer - 
Florence Turner -
Gaston Glass -
Montagu Love -
Walter McGrail -
Mary Thurman - 
Charlotte Walker -
Jean Girardin -

References

External links
The Mad Marriage @ IMDb.com

1925 films
American silent feature films
Lost American films
1925 drama films
American black-and-white films
Silent American drama films
1925 lost films
Lost drama films
1920s American films